José Antonio Dammert Bellido (August 20, 1917 – September 10, 2008) was a Peruvian bishop of the Roman Catholic Church. 

Bellido was born in Lima, Peru and ordained a priest on December 21, 1946. Bellido was appointed Auxiliary bishop of the Archdiocese of Lima, along with Titular Bishop of Amathus in Palaestina, on April 14, 1958 and ordained bishop May 15, 1958. On March 15, 1962 he was appointed Bishop of Diocese of Cajamarca and would remain in post until his retirement on December 1, 1992. 

Bellido died on September 10, 2008

See also
Archdiocese of Lima
Diocese of Cajamarca

External links
Catholic Hierarchy

1917 births
2008 deaths
Participants in the Second Vatican Council
20th-century Roman Catholic bishops in Peru
Roman Catholic bishops of Cajamarca